Moscow Inter-Bank Offer rate is an indicative rate of ruble money market calculated by Central Bank of Russia on a daily basis. MIBID and MIACR (Moscow Interbank Bid / Actual Credit Rate, respectively) are also calculated alongside MIBOR. Official statistics on rates bid, offered and traded are collected from about 30 participating (appointed by CB) banks.

Reference rates